Felt is a small unincorporated community and census-designated place (CDP) in Cimarron County, Oklahoma, United States. As of the 2010 census it had a population of 93. It was named for C.F.W. Felt of the Santa Fe Railroad. Nearby is the Cedar Breaks Archeological District, included on the National Register of Historic Places listings in Cimarron County, Oklahoma. The community is served by a post office (established July 16, 1926) and a school. During the Great Depression in 1936 a farm in Felt was the site of the iconic Dust Bowl photograph known as Dust Bowl Cimarron County, Oklahoma.

Felt was the original destination of the Elkhart and Santa Fe Railway.  This line, both leased to and a wholly owned subsidiary of the Atchison, Topeka and Santa Fe Railway, was built in 1925 from Elkhart, Kansas through Boise City to the town, and extended to Clayton, New Mexico in 1932; but, the whole segment from Boise City to Clayton was abandoned in 1942.

Geography

Felt is located in southwestern Cimarron County, near the western end of the Oklahoma Panhandle. Felt is less than five miles north of the Texas border, and just over 12 miles east of the New Mexico border.  It is the nearest Oklahoma community to the Texhomex marker, being about 14  miles east-northeast of the tripoint of Texas, Oklahoma and New Mexico.  U.S. Routes 56, 64, and 412 pass concurrently through the community, leading northeast  to Boise City, the Cimarron County seat, and southwest  to the larger Clayton, New Mexico. The town is essentially surrounded by the Rita Blanca National Grassland, and the federally-maintained Felt Picnic Site is just south of town.

Demographics

References

Census-designated places in Cimarron County, Oklahoma
Census-designated places in Oklahoma
Oklahoma Panhandle